The Bihar Light Horse was raised in 1862 and formed part of the Cavalry Reserve in the British Indian Army. The regimental headquarters was at Muzaffarpur in Bihar. The regiment was disbanded following India's independence in 1947.

A light horse regiment was roughly equivalent to a battalion in strength (~ 400 men) and its troops typically fought as mounted infantry rather than traditional cavalry.

History
When the 1857 Mutiny broke out in India, Fred Collingridge of the Doudpur factory proposed the formation of a defence force for the British residents of Muzaffarpur. 53 Englishmen under the command of Minden James Wilson chose the civil surgeon, Dr. A. Simpson's bungalow for a defence post, calling it "Fort Pill Box" in his honour. In 1862, Collingridge and C. T. Metcalfe, a Joint Magistrate, submitted an application for the raising of a Mounted Volunteer Corps to the Commissioner of the Behar division. Sanction was obtained and on 8 December 1862, the Soubah Behar Mounted Rifles Volunteer Corps was formed. The first commandant was Major James Furlong.

The regiment was renamed the Bihar Light Horse Volunteer Corps on 29 February 1884. Its motto, adopted on 1 April 1917, "Nec Aspera Terrent" (They are not frightened of hardships). It ceased to exist as a Volunteer Corps, becoming the Bihar Light Horse Auxiliary Force, in October 1920.

Action
54 officers and men of the regiment were granted leave in 1900 to travel to South Africa to fight the Boers. For bravery in battle, Captain J. B. Rutherford was awarded the Distinguished Service Order. Sergeant Major C. M. C. Marsham and Corporal Percy Jones received the Distinguished Conduct Medal.

References
 In Memory of the Bihar Light Horse, available at Bihar Light Horse

Military units and formations established in 1862
British Indian Army cavalry regiments
1862 establishments in India